Rabbi Hirschel Ben Arye Löb Levin (also known as Hart Lyon and Hirshel Löbel; 1721 – 26 August 1800) was Chief Rabbi of Great Britain and of Berlin, and Rabbi of Halberstadt and Mannheim, known as a scholarly Talmudist.

Life
He was born in Rzeszów, Polish–Lithuanian Commonwealth to Aryeh Löb and Miriam Lowenstam. His father was rabbi at Amsterdam and his mother was daughter of Rabbi Chacham Zvi Ashkenazi. He was a descendant of Elijah Ba'al Shem of Chelm.

His glosses on the Talmud appear in the Vilna edition under the name of Rabbi Tsvi Hersh Berlin. His son, Rabbi Solomon Hirschell was also Chief Rabbi of the British German and Polish Jewish community, and the first of the British empire. His other son, Saul Berlin, was a Talmudist and notorious forger of the Besamim Rosh.

References

External links
  
  
 
The British Chief Rabbinate

Chief rabbis of the United Kingdom
18th-century German rabbis
Polish emigrants to the United Kingdom
British people of Czech-Jewish descent
British people of Polish-Jewish descent
18th-century English rabbis
1721 births
1800 deaths
People from Rzeszów
Polish emigrants to Germany
Rabbis from London